The European Universities Basketball Championships were the first championships, along with the European Universities Volleyball Championships, to be included on the EUSA Sports Program. Organised annually since 2001, the European Universities Basketball Championships are coordinated by the European University Sports Association, along with the 18 other sports on the program of the European Universities Championships.

Overview

External links 
 EUSA official website

References

basketball
Universities